Fairmount Bagel is a Montreal-style bagel bakery in Montreal, Quebec, Canada in the Mile End neighbourhood of the Plateau-Mont-Royal borough. The first location opened on September 7, 1919 on Saint-Laurent Boulevard by Isadore Shlafman. The current location, on 74 Fairmount Avenue West was opened in 1949. Fairmount Bagel remains a family-run business.

History 

Fairmount Bagel was the first bagel bakery of its kind in Montreal. Isadore Shlafman, known as Grandfather Isadore, moved from Russia to Canada, and opened the bakery in 1919 – originally called the Montreal Bagel Bakery, located on Saint-Laurent Boulevard. In 1949, Grandfather Isadore moved from the Saint-Laurent location to a cottage on Fairmount Avenue. The location of the bakery was moved to the first floor of their home, and the family lives upstairs. The Shlafman family changed the name, in accompaniment to the new location, to “The Original Fairmount Bagel Bakery”. Since the opening, Fairmount Bagel has remained a family-run business. Grandfather Isadore passed the business down to his son Jack Shlafman, who then passed it to his son, Irwin Shlafman. The same methods are used to make the bagels – rolled by hand and baked in an old-fashioned wood-burning oven.

Culture 

Jewish immigrants from Eastern Europe, specifically Poland, introduced the Montreal bagel to North America. Originally, the “beugel” was a traditional gift, first, to the King of Poland, John III Sobieski, then more commonly to new mothers. From here, the bagel ended up being sold in the city streets of Russia and was called "bublik". In the first half of the 20th century, after being brought to North America, these bagels were almost exclusively made and sold within the Montreal Jewish communities. In the 1970s, the Montreal bagel gained popularity on the other side of the Canadian border and were mass-produced to supply this demand.

Products 
Montreal-style bagels are smaller, less chewy, and sweeter than the New York style bagel. The former is also made with honey and malt syrup. The process of making this baked good consists of hand-rolling and then submerging the bagel dough in boiling water for roughly 3 minutes, then baking it in a wood-fired oven for 20 minutes.

At Fairmount, sesame bagels make up 70 percent of their sales. Nonetheless, the company has a range of fresh products. The store sells several “schmears”, such as tubs of cream cheese, for customers to apply to their bagels.

Media and news

Fairmount Bagels in space 
In May 2008, Astronaut Greg Chamitoff, the nephew of the owner of the store, took products from Fairmount Bakery with him on a mission, STS-124, to the International Space Station.

Future of wood-fired ovens 
There was concern that new environmental laws would lead to the outlawing of the wood-burning ovens that contribute to the character of the Montreal bagel. However, existing ovens have been grandfathered under the new legislation and are safe for now.

Documentary about Fairmount Bagel 
Filmmakers Jonathan Keijser, from Halifax, and Daniel Beresh, from Edmonton, who spent time in Montreal pursuing musical-theatre projects, created a documentary about Fairmount Bagel, “Bagels in the Blood”.

See also
 Historic Jewish Quarter, Montreal
 List of bakeries
 Schwartz's
 Wilensky's
 St-Viateur Bagel

References

External links
Fairmount Bagel

1919 establishments in Quebec
Ashkenazi Jewish culture in Montreal
Bagel companies
Montreal cuisine
History of Montreal
Landmarks in Montreal
Bakeries of Canada
Jewish Canadian history
Le Plateau-Mont-Royal
Jews and Judaism in Montreal
Russian-Jewish culture in Canada
Shops in Montreal